The First Presbyterian Church in Glasgow, Kentucky is a historic church at Washington and Broadway which was built in 1853.  It was added to the National Register of Historic Places in 1983.

The First Presbyterian Church was founded in 1803.  Its 1853 brick building, at the original site for the church, is the oldest church building in Glasgow, and one of few Gothic Revival-style structures.  It has pilasters, Gothic arches, a wood bell tower, and common bond brickwork.

References

See also
National Register of Historic Places listings in Kentucky

Presbyterian churches in Kentucky
Churches on the National Register of Historic Places in Kentucky
Gothic Revival church buildings in Kentucky
Churches completed in 1853
19th-century Presbyterian church buildings in the United States
National Register of Historic Places in Barren County, Kentucky
Glasgow, Kentucky
1853 establishments in Kentucky